"I'm Coming Home" is the title track from the 1973 album by Johnny Mathis.  The song was written by Thom Bell and Linda Creed.

Chart performance
"I'm Coming Home" was Mathis' only release as a solo artist to make it to number one on the Billboard Easy Listening chart.  "I'm Coming Home" went to number one for a single week in September 1973. The single was also a minor pop hit; it peaked at number seventy-five on the Billboard Hot 100.

Cover versions
The Spinners re-recorded the song for their 1974 album, Mighty Love.  Their version peaked at number eighteen on the Billboard Hot 100 and number three on the Hot Soul Singles chart.

See also
List of number-one adult contemporary singles of 1973 (U.S.)

References

1973 singles
1974 singles
Johnny Mathis songs
The Spinners (American group) songs
Songs written by Thom Bell
Songs written by Linda Creed
1973 songs
Atlantic Records singles